Frances Sally McLaren is a British painter, printmaker and etcher who was born in London in 1936. She lives and works in East Knoyle, Wiltshire.

Art education
McLaren studied at the Ruskin School of Art in Oxford from 1956 to 1959 where she won two prizes for painting.

She then completed her postgraduate training at the Central School of Art and Design in London from 1959 to 1961 under the tuition of Merlyn Evans and Tony Harrison where she gained a thorough grounding in etching techniques.

McLaren won a French Government scholarship to study at Atelier 17 in Paris from 1961 to 1962 with Stanley William Hayter. She found Hayter's personality electrifying and this had a lasting influence on her work.

Career
McLaren was elected to associate membership (ARE) of the Royal Society of Painter-Etchers and Engravers (now the Royal Society of Painter-Printmakers) in 1961 while she was still a student and subsequently became a Fellow of the Royal Society of Painter-Printmakers in 1973, which entitles McLaren to use the post-nominal letters RE after her name. McLaren was also an original member of the Printmakers Council of Great Britain, becoming a Fellow in 1971.

Teaching: McLaren taught etching at Goldsmiths College of Art in London from 1962 to 1965.

Work
In 1971 the Arts Review critic commented that her earlier work was influenced by Hayter, and although she had absorbed his techniques she subsequently 'turned it to her own ends'.

Largely abstract, McLaren's work has been described as a 'vision of a rural idyll rooted in the bold sweeps' of the countryside, which rarely dissolves into total abstraction, but treads a path between abstract and a realistic view of nature.

Her work takes inspiration from the land, seascape and the elements, with her priority being to 'simplify'. She is influenced by the feeling of 'walking inside a painting', something she experiences when looking at Mark Rothko's work. Her colour palette echoes the landscape: Cinnabar Green and Raw Umber reflects the Wiltshire countryside with Ultramarine and Cobalt blue representing flax fields. McLaren's etching observes the marks made on the land and on rock faces, with studio based drawings of graphite-stick and pencil often made from her subconscious.

Her work in either oils or watercolour projects a pattern of surface colour and her considerable experience of printmaking, using texture to build shapes and colour, results in bold expressive work.

Exhibitions

Solo exhibitions
 1964 Bear Lane Gallery, Oxford
 1982 Hambledon Gallery, Blandford, Dorset
 2016 Bankside Gallery, London
 2017 At The Chapel, Bruton, Somerset

Group exhibitions

 1962 Royal Academy Summer Exhibition, London
 1962 & 1964 Women's International Art Club, FBA Galleries, London
1964-1966 North-West Printmakers, Seattle, USA
1964 Atelier 17 Group Show, Paris 
1966 Ljubljana Print Biennale, Slovenia 
1966 Edinburgh International Festival, Scotland 
1967 Associated American Artists Gallery, New York, USA 
1971 Sydney Rothman Gallery, New Jersey, USA 
 1978 Royal Academy Summer Exhibition, London
1982 Cork Street Fine Arts, London 
1983 La Jeune Gravure Contemporaine, Paris 
 1983 Royal Academy Summer Exhibition, London
 2003 Royal Academy Summer Exhibition, London
2017 Museum of Contemporary Art, Yinchuan, China 
2017 Royal West of England Academy, Bristol 
2018 Messums Gallery and Arts Centre, Wiltshire
2022 Sladers Yard Gallery, Dorset, 22 January - 5 March 2022

Galleries and museums
McLaren's work is in the Scarborough Art Gallery and Salisbury Library & Galleries.

Her work is also held in the following collections, galleries and museums:

 The New York Public Library
 The Scottish Arts Council
 The Ashmolean Museum, Oxford 
 The Government Art Collection
Greenwich Library
The Greater London Council
Glasgow University Collection

References

Further reading
Turner, Silvie & Webster, Ruaridh (eds), The Art of Sally McLaren, 2016. Available at the National Art Library, Victoria and Albert Museum, London. General collection number 604.AT.0086. OCLC No. 1008178796.

External links
 Sally McLaren
 Art UK
 Royal Academy, London. Summer Exhibition catalogues
 The Royal Society of Painter-Printmakers, Sally McLaren

1936 births
Living people